Khalaas is a 2008 Maldivian erotic horror thriller film directed by Ahmed Nimal. Produced by Ali Seezan under C-Xanal Movies, the film stars Ali Seezan, Mariyam Afeefa and Nadhiya Hassan in pivotal roles.

Plot
Faya (Ali Seezan) and Sara (Mariyam Afeefa), a newly married couple relocate themselves to Sri Lanka and they experience strange horrific incidences within the house they live in. Faya bumps into a girl Reena (Nadhiya Hassan) who intentionally drops her wallet, inviting him to her house where they share intimacy. He stays all night with her while a scared Sara is encountered with a supernatural force. She wakes up the next morning while being admitted in the hospital and Faya promises her never to leave her side again.

Faya hesitantly continues meeting Reena. Sara discovers a small photograph of Reena in the pocket of one of his shirts and conclude that they are having an affair. After a series of events, it was revealed that Reena actually has committed suicide in a locked room of the very same house Faya resides, years back when her family dejects her relationship with her impoverished boyfriend, a lookalike of Faya.

Cast 
 Ali Seezan as Faya
 Mariyam Afeefa as Sara
 Nadhiya Hassan as Reena
 Ahmed Nimal as Ismail

Soundtrack

Accolades

References

2008 films
2008 horror films
Erotic horror films
Maldivian horror films
Films directed by Ahmed Nimal